The Roman Catholic Diocese of Jaipur (Dioecesis Iaipurensis) in India was created on July 20, 2005, when the Diocese of Ajmer and Jaipur was split. It is a suffragan diocese of the Archdiocese of Agra. Its bishop is Oswald Lewis, the first one in the diocese's history, previously auxiliary bishop of Meerut. The parish church Our Lady of the Annunciation at Malviya Nagar is now the cathedral for the diocese.

The diocese covers 21 districts of the state of Rajasthan. Neighboring dioceses are the Diocese of Ajmer to the south, the Archdiocese of Delhi, the Diocese of Jalandhar and the Diocese of Simla-Chandigarh to the north, the Archdiocese of Agra and the Diocese of Gwalior to the east and Pakistan to the west.

External links
GCatholic.org
Catholic-hierarchy.org
Vatican press release on the creation

Roman Catholic dioceses in India
Christianity in Rajasthan
Christian organizations established in 2005
Roman Catholic dioceses and prelatures established in the 21st century
2005 establishments in Rajasthan